Police Medal may refer to:

Australia
Australian Police Medal
National Police Service Medal
Police Overseas Service Medal (Australia)
Police Diligent and Ethical Service Medal, New South Wales Police Force
South Australia Police Service Medal
Various medals of the Victoria Police#Honours and awards
Western Australia Police Medal

Bangladesh
 Bangladesh Police#Medals

British colonies
African Police Medal for Meritorious Service
Colonial Police Medal
Colonial Police Long Service Medal

Canada
Order of Merit of the Police Forces
Royal Canadian Mounted Police Long Service Medal
Police Exemplary Service Medal

France
Honour medal of the National Police

India
Police Medal (India) (from 1951)
President's Police Medal
Indian Police Medal (until 1951)

Myanmar
Orders, decorations, and medals of Myanmar

New Zealand
New Zealand Police Meritorious Service Medal
New Zealand Police Long Service and Good Conduct Medal

Shanghai International Settlement
Shanghai Municipal Police#Awards

Sierra Leone
Sierra Leone Police Medals, 1961–71. Versions for Gallantry, Meritorious Service and Long Service

Singapore
Pingat Keberanian Polis, also known as the Police Medal of Valour and the Police Gallantry Medal

South Africa
South African Police decorations

Sri Lanka (formerly Ceylon)
Ceylon Police Medal
Awards and decorations of the Sri Lanka Police

United Kingdom and the Commonwealth
Queen's Police Medal
Police Long Service and Good Conduct Medal
Overseas Territories Police Medal

United States
United States law enforcement decorations

See also
Queen's Gallantry Medal